St Mary's Church is a parish church in Lamberhurst, Kent. It is a Grade I listed building.

Building 
The first buildings on the site were erected in Saxon times.  Records show there was a church or chapel of some sort here in AD998, and that it was consecrated during that year (24th September).  The building has been expanded, adapted and updated many times since then.  There is an ancient Yew tree by the porch of the church that is estimated to be over 1500 years old, predating the church.

Stained Glass

Some of the stained glass in the church was designed by John Piper.

Burials and memorials 
The church has a series of wall monuments, the most notable a black and white aedicule to Richard Thomas d.1657, and the series of marble plaques to the Husseys in the south (Scotney) chapel, including those of Edward Hussey, d.1894 and Christopher Hussey, d.1970.

See also 
 Lamberhurst
 List of churches in Kent

References 

Church of England church buildings in Kent
Grade I listed churches in Kent
Grade I listed buildings in Kent